Elder Island is a British musical group from Bristol.

The group was founded under the name Trouvaille, and was initially conceived as an experimental folk exploration whilst studying various art degrees in Bristol & South Wales. Their house-inflected 2014 debut received airplay on BBC Radio 6. The group continued working in jobs outside of the band alongside recording and producing side work included interior decoration, club management, graphic design, and art department work at Aardman Animations.

Elder Island's first full-length, The Omnitone Collection, was released in 2019. The group toured North America in 2019 in support of the album.

In November 2020, the group announced a new release, Feral.

Members
Katy Sargent - vocals, cello, bass
Luke Thornton - bass, drums, guitar, keys
David Havard - guitar, keys, bass, drums

Discography
LPs
The Omnitone Collection (2019)
Swimming Static (2021)

EPs
Elder Island (2014)
Seeds in Sand (2016)
Welcome State/Bonfires (2017)
Additions Attachments (2022)

Singles
What It's Worth  (2014)
The Big Unknown (2014)
Bamboo (2016)
Golden (2016)
Welcome State (2017)
Bonfies (2017)
Don't Lose (2018)
You & I (2018)
Kape Fear (2019)
Feral (2020)
Small Plastic Heart (2020)
Purely Educational (2021)
Sacred (2021)
Motive (2022)

References

British electronic music groups
British indie pop groups
British soul musical groups
Musical groups from Bristol